Oldmoor Wood is a woodland in Nottinghamshire, England, near the village of Strelley. It is owned and managed by the Woodland Trust. During early spring, Oldmoor Woods is blanketed in a carpet of English and Spanish bluebells.

References

Forests and woodlands of Nottinghamshire